The North American Star League was a professional e-sports league that features the games StarCraft II and Heroes of Newerth.  Originally modeled after successful South Korean professional StarCraft leagues, it was founded in 2011 by Russell Pfister and Duncan Stewart. Following the mid-year departure of Stewart, Mark K. Brown was tapped to fill the position of Chief Operating Officer in August 2011, and held that position until late-2014.

Origins

Professional-level competition in StarCraft was originally a South Korean phenomenon that began in the early 2000s (decade). Leagues such as Starleague and GOMTV offered 24-hour television coverage and live competitions held in arena venues. However, until the formation of the NASL, North American StarCraft competitions were limited to one-off events hosted by Major League Gaming and smaller gaming associations.

The NASL was developed by Russell Pfister, owner of the video-game coaching website Gosucoaching.  The source of the funding for the start-up's first season and first season's finals event prize pool were not revealed.  Before the start of the NASL's season two in September 2011, multiple season sponsors were secured and announced by C.O.O. Mark K. Brown, including Eizo Nanao Technologies, Kingston HyperX, and iBUYPOWER, Although StarCraft games are one-on-one, head-to-head matches, players are typically sponsored and represented by teams.

Season 1
In its first season, the league was made up of 50 StarCraft players divided into 5 divisions. Divisional matches were played weeknights for a nine-week period. Then, in a week-long open invitational tournament, 1000 players competed for a single berth in the league finals.  The finals consisted of a sixteen-person play-off with the tournament winner receiving $50,000 US out of a total $100,000 US, a record prize pool amount at the time.

The North American Star League's broadcast debut was made on April 5, 2011. After nine weeks of play and a playoff bracket, along with an open qualifier tournament, the Grand Finals of the first season took place July 8–10, 2011 in Ontario, California. In a best of seven series, South Korean player Puma, who clinched the final spot out of the open bracket for the Grand Finals, defeated fellow Korean MC 4-3 and walked away with $50,000 in prize money.

Season 2
Season 2 of the North American Star League consisted of 40 StarCraft players divided into 4 divisions. The season also included a Heroes of Newerth team-based competition. The finals were held on December 2 through 4, 2011 at the Ontario Convention Center in Ontario, California.

The North American Star League started broadcasting Season two on September 14, 2011. Some major changes to the format from season one involved the number of players being reduced from 50 to 40. The main season lasted 8 weeks leading up to the Grand Finals. The top two finishers in each division were seeded into the main bracket. From the remaining players, the top 20 will be placed in five qualifier brackets. The winners of each qualifier bracket will be placed into the main bracket. The last spot goes to the winner of the semi open tournament. Season two Grand Finals took place December 2–4, 2011 in Ontario, California. The returning champion from season one, Lee "PuMa" Ho Joon from Evil Geniuses battled it out against Song "HerO" Hyeon Deok from Team Liquid in a best of seven series. PuMa defeated HerO 4-2 becoming a two time NASL Champion and winning $40,000 in prize money.

Season 3
Season 3 of the North American Star League began on April 11, 2012, and consisted of 45 StarCraft players divided into 5 divisions. The season also included a Tribes: Ascend team-based competition. The finals were held on July 14 and 15, 2012 at the International Centre in Toronto, Canada.

Season 3 Roster

Division 1
 PuMa
 HwangSin
 ClouD
 TT1
 BRAT_OK
 Zenio
 HayprO
 Nightend
 Stephano

Division 2
 HerO
 DeMuslim
 DarkForcE
 CrazyMoviNG
 Nony
 Dimaga
 Ryung
 Hasuobs
 Sjow

Division 3
 Sen
 Ganzi
 MaNa
 TLO
 ViBe
 Rain
 Strelok
 Axslav
 HuK

Division 4
 Thorzain
 Catz
 Alicia
 LoWeLy
 SeleCT
 CrunCher
 aLive
 IdrA
 Ret

Division 5
 Morrow
 Puzzle
 Jinro
 QXC
 MC
 Polt
 Targa
 Sheth
 WhiteRa

Season 4

Season 4 of the North American Star League began on September 12, 2012, and consisted of 45 StarCraft players divided into 5 divisions. The finals were held December 8 and 9, 2012 at the Center Theater in Long Beach, California.

Season 4 Roster

Division 1
 aLive
 Arthur
 DongRaeGu
 Hasuobs
 HuK
 MaSa
 MorroW
 Polt
 RetDivision 2
 ClouD
 Galaxy
 Hyun
 Naniwa
 Oz
 PuMa
 SeleCT
 TLO
 Zenio

Division 3
 Alicia
 BeastyQT
 Dark
 Ganzi
 HerO
 Lowely
 MaNa
 Strelok
 VioletDivision 4
 Bischu
 Hwangsin
 MC
 Ryung
 Sheth
 TaeJa
 TargA
 Thorzain
 ViBe

'''Division 5
 DeMusliM
 Dimaga
 Finale
 MMA
 Nightend
 QXC
 Sen
 Stephano
 TT1

Shows & Segments
In addition to league programming, the North American Star League began producing eSports related segments and shows, including:
 The Pulse
 Eyes on the Community
 Top 10
 NA Update
 EU Update
 KR Update
 SEA Update
 Up to Speed
 Soe's Corner
 Fierce Fitness
 Mining Out
 eSports Retirement

Notable players
Lim Yo-Hwan (known as "SlayerS_Boxer"), one of Korea's most successful and recognized players, joined the NASL in March 2011. Other notable players include the leading StarCraft progamers Jang Min Chul ("SK.MC"), Park Sung-Joon ("JulyZerg"), Lee Yun-Yeol ("NaDa"), rival former professional Warcraft 3 players Jang Jae Ho ("Moon") and Manuel Schenkhuizen ("Grubby") as well as caster/player Daniel Stemkoski ("Artosis").

See also
StarCraft: Brood War professional competition
Starleague (Ongamenet)
MBCgame Starleague
GOMTV Global StarCraft II League

References

StarCraft competitions